Holland "Holly" Aplin (May 19, 1926 – June 23, 1998) was a Canadian football player who played for the Saskatchewan Roughriders. He played college football at the University of Tampa.

References

1926 births
1998 deaths
American football ends
Canadian football ends
American players of Canadian football
Tampa Spartans football players
Saskatchewan Roughriders players
Players of American football from Florida
Players of Canadian football from Florida